The Summons is a legal thriller novel by noted American author John Grisham which was released in February 2002.

Plot summary

The main character, Ray Atlee, is a law professor with a good salary at the University of Virginia. He has a brother, Forrest, and a father, known to many as Judge Reuben V. Atlee. Ray is sent to his father's house in Clanton, Mississippi, to discuss issues regarding the old man's will and estate. To do this, Ray has to go to fictional Ford County, Mississippi, the setting for four of John Grisham's other books including A Time To Kill. When he finds his father dead in the study, Ray discovers a sum of over $3 million in the house, money which is not part of Judge Atlee's will. Ray immediately thinks the money is "dirty" because his father could not possibly have made so much money in his career.

Assuming that he is the only one who knows about the money, Ray decides to take it without making it officially part of the estate, and does not tell anyone about it: he knows that if he made it a part of the estate, taxes would take most of the money. But later reality proves otherwise. Ray is being followed; someone else knows about the money. After his own investigations into the roots of the money and the identity of his shadow—including trips to casinos and shady meetings with prominent southern lawyers—he eventually discovers that Forrest has the money. He finds Forrest in a drug rehab compound and confronts him. At the end both part, with Forrest telling Ray that he will contact him in a year.  

2000 American novels
Novels by John Grisham
Legal thriller novels
Doubleday (publisher) books